Anne Curzan is a professor of English at the University of Michigan since 2012 and dean of its College of Literature, Science, and the Arts since 2019.

Biography
Curzan received a bachelor of arts in linguistics summa cum laude from Yale University in 1991. She received a master of arts and a doctor of philosophy in English language and literature from the University of Michigan in 1995 and 1998, respectively.

Curzan is a member of the American Heritage Dictionary Usage Panel and the American Dialect Society, which votes on the Word of the Year. She writes regularly for The Chronicle of Higher Education's language blog, Lingua Franca, and is a co-host of the program That's What they Say on Michigan Radio.

In 2019, she was appointed dean of the College of Literature, Science, and the Arts.

Awards and honors
Curzan has received awards for her work, including the Henry Russel Award, the Faculty Recognition Award, and the John Dewey Award.

Books
  How English works: A linguistic introduction
  First day to final grade: A graduate student's guide to teaching, with Lisa Damour
  Gender shifts in the history of English
  The secret life of words: English words and their origins
  Fixing English: Prescriptivism and language history

Notes

Women linguists
Linguists of English
Yale College alumni
University of Michigan alumni
University of Michigan faculty
University of Washington faculty
Year of birth missing (living people)
Living people
Place of birth missing (living people)
21st-century linguists
Historical linguists
Corpus linguists
Lexicographers
Women lexicographers
Education writers
American education writers
21st-century American educators
Linguists from the United States
Writing teachers
American women academics
American women non-fiction writers
21st-century American women educators